Pickerington is a city in Fairfield and Franklin counties in the central region of the U.S. state of Ohio. It is a suburb of Columbus. The population was 23,094 at the 2020 census. It was founded in 1815 as Jacksonville, named after Andrew Jackson. The name was changed in 1827 in honor of its founder, Abraham Pickering. As land annexation, development, and immigration into the Columbus area continues, the city of Pickerington (like many area suburbs) has generally followed suit. Pickerington is home to the Motorcycle Hall of Fame, located off of Interstate 70.

The Ohio Secretary of State certified Pickerington as a city in 1991 and it was designated as the "Violet Capital of Ohio" in 1996 by the Ohio Legislature. At , Pickerington is the second-largest city in Fairfield County behind Lancaster. Pickerington is located just east of Columbus. The city features a historic downtown shopping area, while Violet Township is home to rolling hills, log houses, forests, and fields.

Geography
Pickerington is located at  (39.892168, −82.763837).

Demographics

2010 census
As of the census of 2010, there were 18,291 people, 6,226 households, and 4,869 families living in the city. The racial makeup of the city was 80.1% White, 13.0% African American, 0.2% Native American, 2.9% Asian, 0.7% from other races, and 3.1% from two or more races. Hispanic or Latino of any race were 2.5% of the population.

There were 6,226 households, of which 50.7% had children under the age of 18 living with them, 61.8% were married couples living together, 11.5% had a female householder with no husband present, 4.8% had a male householder with no wife present, and 21.8% were non-families. 17.5% of all households were made up of individuals, and 5% had someone living alone who was 65 years of age or older. The average household size was 2.92 and the average family size was 3.33.

The median age in the city was 32.9 years. 33.3% of residents were under the age of 18; 6.6% were between the ages of 18 and 24; 31.5% were from 25 to 44; 22% were from 45 to 64; and 6.8% were 65 years of age or older. The gender makeup of the city was 48.6% male and 51.4% female.

2000 census
As of the census of 2000, there were 9,792 people, 3,468 households, and 2,687 families living in the city. The population density was 1,317.4 people per square mile (508.8/km). There were 3,573 housing units at an average density of 480.7 per square mile (185.7/km). The racial makeup of the city was 93.18% White, 3.72% African American, 0.08% Native American, 1.38% Asian, 0.04% Pacific Islander, 0.41% from other races, and 1.19% from two or more races. Hispanic or Latino of any race were 1.35% of the population.

There were 3,468 households, out of which 48.5% had children under the age of 18 living with them, 65.3% were married couples living together, 8.9% had a female householder with no husband present, and 22.5% were non-families. 18.4% of all households were made up of individuals, and 4.4% had someone living alone who was 65 years of age or older. The average household size was 2.82 and the average family size was 3.25.

In the city, the population was spread out, with 32.7% under the age of 18, 6.5% from 18 to 24, 35.6% from 25 to 44, 19.8% from 45 to 64, and 5.4% who were 65 years of age or older. The median age was 33 years. For every 100 females, there were 97.2 males. For every 100 females age 18 and over, there were 92.6 males.

The median income for a household in the city was $63,664, and the median income for a family was $71,161. Males had a median income of $51,155 versus $31,850 for females. The per capita income for the city was $25,839. About 2.6% of families and 3.2% of the population were below the poverty line, including 3.6% of those under age 18 and 1.8% of those age 65 or over.

Law and government
Pickerington uses the weak-mayor version of the mayor-council government, which constitutes an elected executive mayor position, an elected city council, and an appointed city manager position.

Mayor
The current mayor, Lee A. Gray, was elected in November 2011. Gray previously served as mayor from 1992 to 1999 and as a city council member in 1987.

City council
The Pickerington City Council is a seven-member body that is elected by rolling.  There are four standing committees in the council: the finance committee, the rules committee, the safety committee, and the service committee.

Current council members with elected or re-elected year and position.

Administration
There are several positions appointed between the mayor and city council to aid in the day-to-day management of the city.

Police Department
The Pickerington Police Department, currently led by Chief Tod Cheney, is a 24/7 operation consisting of approximately 30 sworn personnel, 10 civilian dispatchers/records technicians, and 1 administrative assistant.

The police department is responsible for all police activities within the city and is made up of the patrol bureau and detective bureau.

Education
Pickerington Local School District consists of 14 buildings: two high schools, one alternative high school, two junior high schools, three middle schools, and seven elementary schools.  Three of the schools were newly built in 2010: a middle school off Toll Gate Road and elementary schools off Toll Gate Road and in the Sycamore area.

PLSD is made up of approximately 70.2% White, 20.9% African-American, 3% Asian, 1.6% Hispanic, .2% American Indian, and 5% multi-racial students. 10.2% of students are on a free/reduced lunch program. 9.6% are students with disabilities. The school district also has an average attendance rate of 97%.

Schools

High Schools (9-12)
Pickerington High School Central
Pickerington High School North
Pickerington Alternative School

Junior Highs (7-8)
Pickerington Ridgeview Junior High School
Pickerington Lakeview Junior High School

Middle Schools (5-6)
Diley Middle School 
Harmon Middle School 
Toll Gate Middle School

Elementary Schools (K-4)
Fairfield Elementary 
Heritage Elementary
Pickerington Elementary
Violet Elementary
Tussing Elementary 
Sycamore Creek Elementary
Toll Gate Elementary

Notable people

 Alex Bayer, NFL football player
 Justin Boren, NFL player
 Zach Boren, NFL player
 Shane Bowen, NFL coach, Tennessee Titans
 Jake Butt, NFL player
 Taco Charlton, NFL player, Pittsburgh Steelers
 Pat Elflein, NFL player, Carolina Panthers
 Antony Hämäläinen, vocalist for Swedish Melodic Death Metal bands Armageddon and Nightrage
 Lindsay Hollister, television actress
 Caris LeVert, NBA player, Cleveland Cavaliers
 Roger Lewis Jr., NFL player
 Earl Moore, MLB pitcher for Cleveland Indians, first pitcher in American League to throw no-hitter (May 9, 1901)
 Brian Peters, NFL player
 Arthur Raymond Robinson, Indiana senator, "dark horse" presidential candidate on Republican ticket in 1932
 Dan and Tom Ryan, professional Halo players
 Jill Gray Savarese, actress
 Brian Shaffer, Ohio State University medical student who disappeared in Columbus in 2006
 Spencer Sutherland, singer-songwriter
 A. J. Trapasso, football player, Ohio State University and NFL

See also
 Pickerington Ponds Metro Park

References

External links

 

Cities in Ohio
Cities in Franklin County, Ohio
Cities in Fairfield County, Ohio
Populated places established in 1815
1815 establishments in Ohio